Lucas Ramiro Monzón (born 27 February 1996) is an Argentine professional footballer who plays as a defender.

Career
Monzón's career started with Defensores Unidos. He made his senior debut during 2018–19 against Flandria in Primera B Metropolitana, appearing for the full duration of a 2–1 victory on 7 December 2018.

Career statistics
.

References

External links

1996 births
Living people
Place of birth missing (living people)
Argentine footballers
Association football defenders
Primera B Metropolitana players
Defensores Unidos footballers